The 2010 United States Senate election in South Dakota was held on November 2, 2010 along other elections to the United States Senate in other states as well as elections to the United States House of Representatives and various state and local elections. Incumbent Republican U.S. Senator John Thune won re-election to a second term unopposed.

Background 
Thune was narrowly elected to his first term over Democratic Senate Minority Leader Tom Daschle with 51% of the vote in 2004.  In spite of his lack of seniority, Thune rose to the position of chairman of the Republican Policy Committee in the United States Senate.

No members of the South Dakota Democratic Party (or any other party) filed to challenge Thune. Scott Heidepriem, the South Dakota Senate Minority Leader and a Democratic candidate for Governor of South Dakota, said, "We just concluded that John Thune is an extremely popular senator who is going to win another term in the Senate." There were approximately 90,000 undervotes compared to the concurrent gubernatorial election.

Candidate 
 John Thune, incumbent U.S. Senator

Predictions

Polling

Fundraising

Results

References

External links 
 South Dakota Elections and Voter Registration from the Secretary of State
 U.S. Congress candidates for South Dakota at Project Vote Smart
 South Dakota U.S. Senate from OurCampaigns.com
 Campaign contributions from Open Secrets
 2010 South Dakota Senate General Election graph of multiple polls from Pollster.com

 2010 South Dakota Senate Race from CQ Politics
 Race profile from The New York Times
Official campaign websites
 John Thune for U.S. Senator

2010 South Dakota elections
South Dakota
2010
Single-candidate elections